The Uganda national under-17 football team (nicknamed The Cranes), represents Uganda in men's under-17 international football and is controlled by the Federation of Uganda Football Associations, which is a part of CAF.

History

Players
The squad was announced recently postponed 2021 Africa U-17 Cup of Nations.

Recent results & fixtures
The following is a list of match results from the previous 12 months, as well as any future matches that have been scheduled.

Legend

2020

2021

Competitive records

FIFA U-17 World Cup

Africa U-17 Cup of Nations

CECAFA U-17 Championship

References

External links

 
African national association football teams
African national under-17 association football teams
under-17